Black Jesus may refer to:

Catholicism
Cristos Negros of Central America and Mexico
Black Christ of Esquipulas
Black Nazarene
Cristo Negro (Portobelo)

Media
 "Black Jesus", a season-one episode of the TV series Black Lightning
 Black Jesus (film), a 1968 Italian drama film
 Black Jesus (TV series), an American sitcom created by Aaron McGruder and Mike Clattenburg

Songs
 "Black Jesus" (song), a song by American artist Everlast
 "Black Jesus", a song by Lil Yachty on the 2020 album Lil Boat 3
 "Black Jesus + Amen Fashion", a bonus track on the 2011 Lady Gaga album Born This Way
 "Black Jesuz", a song by 2Pac + Outlawz on the 1999 album Still I Rise

People
 Earl Monroe (born 1944; also "Black Jesus"), American retired professional basketball player
 Perrance Shiri (1955–2020; also "Black Jesus"), retired Zimbabwean air officer
 Steven Tari (1971–2013; also "Black Jesus"), Papua New Guinean religious figure

See also
 Black Jesus Voice, a solo album by Richard H. Kirk
 Race and appearance of Jesus